Scott Alexander Brown (born 28 December 1972) is a Glasgow-born Scottish DJ and music producer, now living in Huddersfield, West Yorkshire. Brown produces and plays a variety of genres, although he is most associated with bouncy techno. His music ranges from happy hardcore, through hard trance, to gabber. He is the founder of Evolution Records, which started in 1994.

Music production
Brown has produced music on his own record labels (Evolution Records, Evolution Plus, Evolved, Evolution Gold, Poosh, Screwdriver and Twisted Vinyl), and under a range of monikers including Plus System, The Scotchman, Interstate, Bass-X (with his brother Stewart), and with his band Q-Tex, which was formed in 1991.

Releases and album appearances
His work is featured on Bonkers compilation series. Brown has also appeared on the compilation albums of Dancemanias Speed series. His first appearance on the series was on the third issue of the series in 1999. He later appeared on Trance Ravers.

Other

In April 2006, his release "Elysium" was given a trance remix by Liverpool dance trio Ultrabeat featuring vocals by Rebecca Rudd. This version was released with a subtitle as "Elysium (I Go Crazy)" to signal the addition of vocals.

Later, in May, his song "Go Berzerk" was included in the PlayStation 2 release of Beatmania IIDX 11 IIDXRED, which was not present on the arcade version or audio releases of the game.

In 2008, Brown released a new song, album and DVD called Livewired.

In 2009 two of Brown's tracks, "Commence" (Off his first Hardwired album) and "Digital Distortion Works!" (A collaboration between Brown 
and Neophyte) were featured on an episode of Top Gear in which Richard Hammond and Jeremy Clarkson glues a CD into James May’s car stereo system as well as gluing the volume knob at maximum, leaving James unable to turn the volume down or take the CD out.

In March 2016, Brown collaborated with German Eurodance DJ and producer Special D. to create a new, updated version of "Elysium", also featuring Rebecca Rudd's vocals from Ultrabeat's version. It was released over two digital EPs featuring remixes from several artists, including a UK Hardcore remix by Scott Brown himself which contains samples and inspiration from Brown's original 1999 version.

 Discography Studio albums'''
 The Theory of Evolution (1996)
 Future Progression (1998)
 Livewired'' (2008)

References

External links 
 
 Profile at Discogs

1972 births
Living people
Scottish DJs
Happy hardcore musicians
UK hardcore musicians
Electronic dance music DJs